Kang Kwan-il is a North Korean politician. He is an alternate member of the Central Committee of the Workers’ Party of Korea (WPK).

Career
Starting in March 1964, he served as vice-chair of the WPK in Haeju city. In December 1980 he was appointed head of the Ministry of Construction. In April 1987, he was appointed Chief Secretary of the WPK at Songjin Steel Complex.

In September 2010, he was elected an alternate member of the Central Committee of the Workers' Party of Korea.

Kang served as a member of the national mourning committee upon the death of Kim Jong-il in December 2011.

References

External links
 Korea Institute for National Unification biographical information for key North Korean figures, 2010 

Date of birth unknown
Living people
North Korean politicians
Year of birth missing (living people)